Horse Island (Gaeilge: Oileán Capall) is a presently uninhabited island in County Kerry, Ireland, located close to Portmagee. It is owned by the Mcgill and Dooley families (Ann and John presently) but has been given this land by their ancestors Bridget and Jeremiah.

Demographics

References

Geography of County Kerry
Islands of County Kerry
Important Bird Areas of the Republic of Ireland
Uninhabited islands of Ireland